Flowery Branch is a city in Hall County, Georgia, United States. As of the 2020 census, the city had a population of 9,391. It is part of the Gainesville, Georgia metropolitan area, and lies on the shores of Lake Lanier.

History
Flowery Branch was established in 1874, one year after the Richmond and Danville Air-Line Railroad Railway System built a rail line through the city connecting Charlotte to Atlanta. The city hosts the Historic Caboose exhibit and the Historic Train Depot museum.

Flowery Branch was originally named Anaguluskee, a Cherokee Indian word meaning "flowers on the branch." Other sources claim the original name was Nattagasska ("Blossom Creek"), which long-term residents recall as an alternative nickname for the town.

Andrew Jackson passed through Flowery Branch on his way to the First Seminole War in 1818. The historic Bowman-Pirkle House, built in 1818, was originally located on the border of Flowery Branch and Buford.

Part of the historic Old Federal Road is in Flowery Branch. It was an important route through northern Georgia in the early and mid-1800s. Its most obvious significance lay in four issues: the early history of Cherokee-U.S. social, economic, and cultural relations in the early 1800s, the eventual use of the Road as part of the Trail of Tears, use of the Road during the Georgia Gold Rush, and Union and Confederate use of the Road during the campaigns for Chickamauga in 1863 and Atlanta in 1864.

Ferdinand de Soto entered Hall County in March of 1540 in transit between Stone Mountain and the Conasauga River.

Geography

Flowery Branch is located at  (34.185801, -83.924479).

Flowery Branch is within the Brevard Fault zone.

Natural resources in the Flowery Branch area include: gray marble, marble, clay, granite, graphite, limestone, iron ore, manganese, pegmatite, mica, beryl, quartzite, zircon, lead, copper, silver, and gold as known by the local Gold Hill Mine and regional popularity of The Hall County Gold Belt prospected during the Georgia Gold Rush. Pyrite, known as Fool's Gold, is also abundant in the region. Other resources located within the near vicinity of Flowery Branch include: asbestos, corundum, sand, and precious gems such as diamond and ruby.

Flowery Branch borders Chestnut Mountain and Oakwood. Flowery Branch is on the shores of Lake Lanier.

Demographics

2020 census

As of the 2020 United States census, there were 9,391 people, 2,976 households, and 1,862 families residing in the city.

2000 census
As of the census of 2000, there were 1,806 people, 706 households, and 475 families residing in the town. The racial makeup of the town was 80.22% White, 10.18% African American, 0.44% Native American, 0.28% Asian, 2.21% from other races, and 0.66% from two or more races. Hispanic or Latino people of any race were 9.69% of the population.

There were 706 households, out of which 33.3% had children under the age of 18 living with them, 43.6% were married couples living together, 17.0% had a female householder with no husband present, and 32.6% were non-families. 23.8% of all households were made up of individuals, and 7.1% had someone living alone who was 65 years of age or older.  The average household size was 2.56 and the average family size was 3.01.

In the town, the age distribution of the population shows 25.7% under the age of 18, 12.1% from 18 to 24, 35.4% from 25 to 44, 18.1% from 45 to 64, and 8.6% who were 65 years of age or older.  The median age was 31 years. For every 100 females, there were 103.4 males.  For every 100 females age 18 and over, there were 96.3 males.

The median income for a household in the town was $35,478, and the median income for a family was $38,500. Males had a median income of $29,572 versus $21,382 for females. The per capita income for the town was $16,970.  About 9.5% of families and 13.3% of the population were below the poverty line, including 13.1% of those under age 18 and 21.6% of those age 65 or over.

Economy 
The Atlanta Falcons football team's training camp has been located in Flowery Branch since the start of the 2005 season.

King's Hawaiian operates a 116,000-sq ft bakery and distribution center in Flowery Branch.

Wrigley's, a subsidiary of Mars, Incorporated, manufactures chewing gum products including Juicy Fruit, Orbit, Extra, and 5 in Flowery Branch.

Education
Public education in Flowery Branch is served by Hall County Schools. Flowery Branch High School is the city's local high school.

Popular culture 
Flowery Branch is a popular film location, featured in several movies and television series including:

 Ozark
 Blended

Notable people
Taylor Heinicke, NFL quarterback
Andrew Jannakos, singer-songwriter, known for "Gone Too Soon"
Brad Keller, pitcher for the Kansas City Royals of Major League Baseball
 Phil Niekro, pitcher, MLB Hall of Fame
Connor Shaw, former quarterback for South Carolina and the Cleveland Browns
Deshaun Watson, NFL quarterback
John-Allison Weiss, singer/songwriter

References

External links
 The Flowery Branch Depot historical marker

Cities in Hall County, Georgia
Cities in Georgia (U.S. state)
Populated lakeshore places in the United States